The Welsh National League (North)  was a football league in north and central Wales which formed the first level of the Welsh football league system between 1921 and 1930, and was part of a short-lived plan to create a national football league in Wales during the 1930s.

History
The league was set-up in 1921, absorbing the North Wales Coast League. It ran for nine seasons with the majority of clubs splitting into two leagues that were formed in 1930 - the North Wales Football Combination and the Welsh League.

Champions
The following teams were champions of the leagues.

Division One

1921–22: – Rhos Athletic
1922–23: – Llandudno
1923–24: – Oswestry Town
1924–26: – Mold Town
1925–26: – Rhyl Athletic
1926–27: – Caernarvon Athletic
1927–28: – Bangor
1928–29: – Connah's Quay & Shotton
1929–30: – Caernarvon Athletic

Division Two - West

1921–22: – Conway
1922–23: – Bangor Athletic reserves
1923–24: – Conway
1924–25: – Penmaenmawr
1925–26: – Blaenau Ffestiniog Amateur
1926–27: – Llandudno reserves
1927–28: – Blaenau Ffestiniog Amateur
1929–29: – Llanfairfechan
1929–30: – Bethesda Victoria

Division Two - East

1920–21: – Acrefair Athletic
1921–22: – Oak Alyn Rovers 
1922–23: – No competition
1923–24: – Johnstown
1924–25: – No competition
1925–26: – No competition
1926–27: – No competition
1927–28: – No competition
1929–29: – Denbigh Juniors
1929–30: – Prestatyn

References

Football leagues in Wales
1921 establishments in Wales
1930 disestablishments in Wales
Sports leagues established in 1921
Sports leagues disestablished in 1930
Defunct football competitions in Wales